Gold Sunrise on Magic Mountain is a live album by American jazz vocalist and percussionist Leon Thomas recorded at the Montreux Jazz Festival in 1971 and released by Mega Records on their Flying Dutchman Series.

Track listing
All compositions by Leon Thomas except where noted
 "The Honey Man/Chains of Love" (Thomas/A. Nugetre, Van Walls) – 12:28
 "Cousin Mary" (John Coltrane, Thomas) – 7:45
 "Na Na/Umbo Weti" – 16:52

Personnel
Leon Thomas − vocals, percussion
Oliver Nelson − alto saxophone
Neal Creque - piano
Cornell Dupree – guitar
Victor Gaskin − bass 
David Lee Jr. – drums
Sonny Morgan − congas 
Naná Vasconcelos − berimbau, percussion

References

Leon Thomas live albums
1971 live albums
Flying Dutchman Records live albums
Mega Records live albums
Albums produced by Bob Thiele
Albums recorded at the Montreux Jazz Festival,